A consultative constitutional referendum was held in Moldova on 23 May 1999. It was initiated by President Petru Lucinschi and asked voters whether they approved of changing the system of government to a presidential system. The proposal was approved by 64% of voters. However, the Party of Communists of the Republic of Moldova and the Alliance for Democracy and Reforms opposed Lucinschi, and were able to vote several constitutional changes through parliament on 5 July 2000. The changes reduced the powers of the president and strengthened the parliament and government.

Question

Results

References

Moldova
Constitutional
Referendums in Moldova
Constitutional referendums